Hypersypnoides umbrosa is a species of moth of the family Noctuidae. It is found in Taiwan.

References

Moths described in 1881
Calpinae